Anton Lundell (born October 3, 2001) is a Finnish professional ice hockey centre for the Florida Panthers of the National Hockey League (NHL). Lundell was considered a top prospect for the 2020 NHL Entry Draft, where he was selected 12th overall by the Panthers.

Playing career
Lundell first played as a youth as a 14-year old at the U16 level within the junior program of HIFK. Continuing his development through his fourth season with the club, Lundell made his professional debut registering nine goals and 19 points in 38 games during the 2018–19 Liiga season. Showing potential as a prominent two-way forward, Lundell followed up his rookie season by improving his offensive totals with 10 goals and 28 points in 44 regular season games before the 2019–20 season was cancelled due to the COVID-19 pandemic.

On June 7, 2021, Lundell signed a three-year, entry-level contract with the Florida Panthers. On January 31, 2022, Lundell recorded his first multi-point NHL game (five assists) in the Panthers' 8–4 win over the Columbus Blue Jackets. He was named the NHL Rookie of the Month for January 2022 after recording 17 points in 15 games.

International play

Lundell won a gold medal with the Finland national under-18 team at the 2018 IIHF World U18 Championships, putting up six points in seven games. He won a gold medal with the Finland junior national team at the 2019 World Junior Ice Hockey Championships, producing four points in seven games. After missing the 2020 World Juniors due to injury, Lundell returned for the 2021 World Juniors where he captained Finland to the Bronze Medal. He recorded six goals and ten points in seven games, ranking as one of the tournament's top three leading scorers. He also won a silver medal with the Finland national ice hockey team at the 2021 IIHF World Championship.

Career statistics

Regular season and playoffs

International

References

External links
 

2001 births
Living people
Finnish ice hockey centres
Florida Panthers draft picks
Florida Panthers players
HIFK (ice hockey) players
National Hockey League first-round draft picks
Sportspeople from Espoo
Swedish-speaking Finns